Aaron Chancellor Miller (born May 11, 1993) is an American actor. He is best known for his role as Justus Jones in two Three Investigators films, The Secret of Skeleton Island (2007) and The Secret Of Terror Castle (2009). These movies are based (loosely) on the books originally created by Robert Arthur. Television appearances include guest spots on That's So Raven, Crossing Jordan, and Ugly Betty.

Filmography

Film

Television

External links
 

1993 births
Living people
Male actors from Kentucky
American male film actors
Actors from Lexington, Kentucky